This is a list of the Maryland state historical markers in Harford County.

This is intended to be a complete list of the official state historical markers placed in Harford County, Maryland by the Maryland Historical Trust (MHT). The locations of the historical markers, as well as the latitude and longitude coordinates as provided by the MHT's database, are included below. There are currently 51 historical markers located in Harford County.

References 

Harford County